Executive directors of the United States Chess Federation
 1952–1960 Kenneth Harkness
 1960–1961 Frank Brady
 1963–1964 Joe Reinhardt
 1966–1976 Ed Edmondson
 1977–1978 Martin Morrison
 part year Richard Meyerson
 part year George Cunningham
 1979–1987 Gerald Dullea
 1988–1996 Al Lawrence
 1996 (acting) George Filippone
 1997–1999 Mike Cavallo
 1999–2000 Gerald Dullea
 2000–2002 George DeFeis
 2002–2003 Frank Niro
 2003 (acting) Grant Perks
 2004–2005 Bill Goichberg
 2005–May 2013 Bill Hall
 June 2013-October 2013 Francisco Guadalupe (interim)
 November 2013-October 2017 Jean Hoffman
 October 2017-present Carol B. Meyer

Note: Before 1967, the executive director was called the business manager. Meyerson and Cunningham were titled "staff director".

See also
 Presidents of the United States Chess Federation
 United States Chess Federation
 Fédération Internationale des Échecs (FIDE)
 International Correspondence Chess Federation (ICCF)

References

External links
 Official United States Chess Federation website

Chess organizations
Chess in the United States